Madonna and Child with Two Saints or Madonna and Child in Glory between Saint Francis and Saint Clare is a c.1390-1395 tempera and gold on panel painting by Gentile da Fabriano, now in the Pinacoteca Malaspina in Pavia. It is one of the earliest surviving works attributed to the artist.

It probably originated in the Santa Chiara la Reale monastery in Pavia, founded as a Franciscan house in 1380 by Bianca of Savoy. The gold-working is highly influenced by that of Giovannino de' Grassi.

References

1390s paintings
Paintings of Francis of Assisi
Paintings of the Madonna and Child by Gentile da Fabriano
Paintings of Clare of Assisi